The Karawanken Autobahn (A 11) is an autobahn (motorway)  in Austria. It is part of the European route E61 from Villach to Rijeka.

External links

 Karawanken Autobahn at motorways-exits.com

Autobahns in Austria